Cheirodon pisciculus is a species of fish in the family Characidae endemic to Chile in freshwater environments within a benthopelagic depth range. This species is native to a subtropical climate. C. pisciculus is distributed in the Pacific versant of the Maipo, Aconcagua, the Huasco River basins, and the Estero Quintero in Chile. 
This fish can reach length of 5.4 cm (2.1 in) as an unsexed male.

References

pisciculus
Freshwater fish of Chile
Fish described in 1855
Taxa named by Charles Frédéric Girard
Taxonomy articles created by Polbot
Endemic fauna of Chile